Epipsammia was a genus of moths of the family Noctuidae. It is now considered a synonym of Hecatera. It consisted of the species Epipsammia deserticola, which has been renamed to Hecatera deserticola.

References
Natural History Museum Lepidoptera genus database

Hadeninae